Kalağaylı (also, Kalagayly, Kalagayni, and Kalageyli) is a village and municipality in the Agsu Rayon of Azerbaijan.  It has a population of 275.

References 

Populated places in Agsu District